The Battle of the Sexes is a 1928 American comedy film directed by D. W. Griffith, starring Jean Hersholt, Phyllis Haver, Belle Bennett, Don Alvarado, and Sally O'Neil, and released by United Artists. The film was a remake by Griffith of an earlier film he directed in 1914, which starred Lillian Gish. Both films are based on the novel The Single Standard by Daniel Carson Goodman; the story was adapted for this production by Gerrit J. Lloyd.

The film was released as both a silent film, and in a sound version using the Movietone sound-on-film system. In 2004, the film was released on DVD by Image Entertainment. The theme song of the motion picture, "Just a Sweetheart", by Dave Dryer, Josef Pasternack, and Nathaniel Shilkret (recorded versions of which are available, for example, on a commercially issued Paul Whiteman CD) was omitted from the DVD.

Plot
Marie Skinner (Phyllis Haver) is a gold digger with her hooks out for devoted middle-aged family man J.C. Judson (Jean Hersholt), a portly real estate tycoon, who falls for her when she contrives to meet him.  When his wife (Belle Bennett) and grown children, Ruth (Sally O'Neil) and Billy (William Bakewell) discover him dancing with Marie at a nightclub, J.C. leaves home the next day.  Ruth seeks out Marie to shoot her, but is interrupted by Marie's boyfriend, jazz hound Babe Winsor (Don Alvarado), who takes a shine to her.  When Judson walks in on them he condemns her licentiousness, but is forced to face his double standard when he witnesses a violent argument between Marie and Babe. Full of contrition, J.C. returns to home and hearth and the bosom of his loving family.

Cast
Jean Hersholt as William Judson, the Father
Phyllis Haver as Marie Skinner 
Belle Bennett as Mrs. Judson, the Mother
Sally O'Neil as Ruth Judson, the Daughter
Don Alvarado as Babe Winsor 
William Bakewell as Billy Judson, the Son
John Batten as A friend of the Judsons
Rolfe Sedan as Marie's Barber (uncredited)
Harry Semels as Mr. Judson's Barber (uncredited)

Notes

External links

 

review in The New York Times
Still at silenthollywood.com
Cairns, David (2016), The Forgotten: D.W. Griffith's Battle of the Sexes (1928) at mubi.com (with stills)

1928 comedy films
1928 films
American silent feature films
American black-and-white films
1920s English-language films
Films directed by D. W. Griffith
United Artists films
Remakes of American films
Films based on short fiction
Silent American comedy films
Films scored by Nathaniel Shilkret
1920s American films